Paddy may refer to:

People
Paddy (given name), a list of people with the given name or nickname
An ethnic slur for an Irishman

Birds
Paddy (pigeon), a Second World War carrier pigeon
Snowy sheathbill or paddy, a bird species
Black-faced sheathbill, also known as the paddy bird

Entertainment
Paddy (film), a 1970 Irish comedy
Paddy Kirk, a fictional character in the British soap opera Emmerdale

Other uses
Paddy field, a type of cultivated land
Paddy (unmilled rice)
Paddy mail, a train for construction workers
Paddy Whiskey, a liquor

See also
Patty (disambiguation)
Paddi (disambiguation)
Padi (disambiguation)